Visium Asset Management LP was an American multi-strategy hedge fund. It began as a healthcare-focused hedge fund, founded in 2005 by Jacob Gottlieb. Visium controlled investment funds with about $8 billion of assets under management and had 170 employees at its peak in 2016. That year, three of the company's traders were indicted by United States federal authorities for securities fraud. One of the accused employees killed himself days after he was indicted. Visium subsequently liquidated several of its funds and wound down operations.

Founder 

Jacob Gottlieb was born in Brooklyn, New York, in 1971. He graduated with a Bachelor of Arts in economics from Brown University and went on to receive an M.D. from New York University School of Medicine. While originally seeking to become a surgeon, according to Gottlieb, he decided instead to work on Wall Street after graduating medical school.

Having previously managed healthcare related portfolios for several investment companies, Jacob Gottlieb started Visium Asset Management LP in 2005. Initially starting with Visium Balanced Fund, Gottlieb would explain in a 2012 interview with Institutional Investor that he hoped to have the company later offer enough diversified products to eventually challenge the largest hedge fund managers in the industry.

In 2018, he would begin another firm known as Altium Capital as its first CEO. A 2019 article by The Wall Street Journal reported Gottlieb hired reputation management company Status Labs to challenge negative news coverage about him and Visium while also helping him raise money for Altium Capital.

Business 
Visium Asset Management oversaw numerous funds throughout its existence. In 2015, Visium "managed five hedge funds and a mutual fund" while also reportedly trying to raise $500 million in capital for the creation of a private equity fund, according to Bloomberg News. At the company's most successful point in 2016, they had at least $8 billion in assets under management.

Visium Asset Management started as a family business. Until 2010, Gottlieb's father had a desk within the firm's New York office and, on occasion, informally advised the company on accounting matters. Jacob Gottlieb's brother Mark worked at Visium in various roles, in a move regarded by Bloomberg News interviewee Brad Balter as a "potential conflict of interest". Additionally, Bloomberg reported that portfolio manager Stefan Lumiere "was hired in 2007, two years after his sister Alexandra became engaged to [Jacob] Gottlieb."

Despite his public commitment to "the highest ethical conduct [for Visium employees]", Gottlieb directly owned 25,703 shares of Intercept Pharmaceuticals despite the company having 5.2% stake as well. This caused at least one investor complaint, and the company received accusations of double standards from several employees.

Winding down and closure

Investigation of rogue employees for fraud 
A former junior trader with the firm, Jason Thorell, told the U.S. Securities and Exchange Commission in 2013, according to Reuters, that "Visium employees routinely sought sham quotes from brokers to justify inflated values for debt securities, and deviated from prices set by third-parties on a magnitude beyond what was usual." With the hope of receiving  a payout under the SEC’s whistleblower program which can award whistleblowers up to 30% of any money the SEC collects in a matter, Thorell cooperated with federal investigators and secretly recorded over 200 hours of conversations over two years with individuals at the firm (excerpts of transcripts of the recordings were revealed in Lumiere's criminal fraud trial).

In March 2016, Visium notified shareholders that Visium was being investigated by the United States Department of Justice and the U.S. Securities and Exchange Commission regarding the company's actions in regard to their Credit Opportunities Fund which had been shut down in 2013. The investigation led to large customer withdrawals. Later in June, three traders at the firm were charged with securities fraud. Sanjay Valvani and Chris Plaford were indicted for insider trading while Plaford and Stefan Lumiere were accused of inflating the value of the Credit Opportunities Fund.

United States v. Valvani; suicide 
In 2016, portfolio manager Sanjay Valvani and two others were charged with insider trading by federal prosecutor Preet Bharara, the United States Attorney for the Southern District of New York. Valvani was also charged with engaging in securities fraud and wire fraud from 2005 through 2011, and passing material nonpublic information to another trader who traded on that information. While managing the firm's flagship healthcare fund, according to federal authorities, "Valvani specifically made about $25 million by trading on non-public information about pending drug approvals from the Food and Drug Administration". Valvani had worked for the company since its inception in 2005, and reportedly managed as much as $2 billion in funds. Visium placed Valvani on leave after it was announced that he was under investigation. 

Valvani turned himself in to authorities on June 15, 2016, and was arrested. He pled not guilty to five counts. He was freed on bail in the amount of $5 million, secured by his home. If convicted, Valvani faced up to 85 years in prison.

Valvani's two alleged co-conspirators pled guilty, however.  The two admitted their participation with Valvani in the illegal scheme, and agreed to cooperate in the case against Valvani. 

On June 20, 2016, five days after he was indicted, Valvani was found dead in an apparent suicide. Due to his death, the government's court case against him had to be dropped.

In 2019, attorney Irving Picard, who had led the claw back of funds in the illegal Bernie Madoff securities fraud scheme, filed a complaint on behalf of Visium against Valvani's estate seeking the return of over $100 million by the estate, due to Valvani's alleged illegal conduct and breach of fiduciary duty. The suit was dismissed.

United States v. Lumiere 
Two years after his sister's 2005 marriage to Gottlieb, Stefan Lumiere joined Visium to manage the firm's Credit Opportunities Fund which held assets consisting of distressed debt. He was accused of fraudulently overvaluing the assets of the fund, and was convicted of securities fraud after his case went to trial.

Liquidation 
In the wake of the controversy, Jacob Gottlieb wound down the company. Following negotiations with the Securities and Exchange Commission in 2018, the company paid $10,231,157 to regulators ($4,755,223 disgorgement, prejudgment interest of $720,711, and a civil money penalty of $4,755,223), and closed the activities of the firm. The firm had begun liquidation two years earlier, selling the Visium Global Fund to AllianceBernstein. , the firm was operating under the name VA Management LP.

Notes

Sources

Further reading 

 
 
 
 
 

2005 establishments in the United States
Defunct hedge funds
Hedge fund firms in New York City